Arigatō, Arigatou or in popular culture Arigato (meaning "thank you" in Japanese) may refer to:
Arigatō (manga) by Naoki Yamamoto
Arigato (Kokia song)
"Arigato" (B'z song), 2004
"Arigatō" (Flow song), 2008
 "Arigatō" (Sekai no Doko ni Ite mo), a 2010 single by Hey! Say! JUMP
Arigato!, an album by John Davis
Arigato (Hank Jones album)
Arigatō (Miyuki Nakajima album), 1977
Arigatō (Hatsune Okumura album), 2008